McGuckian is a surname. Notable people with the surname include:

Alan McGuckian (born 1953), Northern Irish Roman Catholic bishop
Mary McGuckian (born 1965), Northern Irish filmmaker
Medbh McGuckian (born 1950), Northern Irish poet

See also
McGuckin